The Shah Noorani shrine in Balochistan was attacked on November 12, 2016. More than 55 people were killed in the attack and another 100 were injured. Several people were killed and injured due to a stampede caused by the blast and scores of injured were transported to the hospital in private vehicles by visitors who survived the attack. ISIS claimed responsibility for the attack.

See also
List of wars and battles involving ISIL
List of terrorist incidents in November 2016
List of terrorist incidents linked to ISIL
Military intervention against ISIL
Terrorist incidents in Pakistan in 2016
Timeline of ISIL-related events (2016)

References

21st-century mass murder in Pakistan
Khuzdar District
Mass murder in Pakistan
Mass murder in 2016
November 2016 crimes in Asia
Terrorist incidents in Pakistan in 2016
ISIL terrorist incidents in Pakistan
2016 murders in Pakistan
Islamic terrorist incidents in 2016